Jakub Maciej Szulc (born December 21, 1973 in Kłodzko) is a Polish politician. He was elected to the Sejm on September 25, 2005 getting 5004 votes in 2 Wałbrzych district, candidating from the Civic Platform list.

See also
Members of Polish Sejm 2005-2007

External links
Jakub Szulc - parliamentary page - includes declarations of interest, voting record, and transcripts of speeches.

1973 births
Living people
Members of the Polish Sejm 2005–2007
Civic Platform politicians
People from Kłodzko
Members of the Polish Sejm 2007–2011